The Phantom of the Big Tent is a 1954 West German thriller film directed by Paul May and starring René Deltgen, Angelika Hauff and Ilse Steppat.

The film's sets were designed by the art directors Hans Kuhnert and Theo Zwierski. It was shot at the Spandau Studios in Berlin, with location filming taking place at a circus in Spandau.

Cast
 René Deltgen as Alfredo Capelli, der Direktor
 Angelika Hauff as Lolita, seine Tochter, Kunstreiterin
 Heidi Becker as Lolita, called Lilly, 10 years old
 Ilse Steppat as Dolores, Frau mit dem Löwen
 Armin Dahlen as Lal Singh, Mann mit dem Elefanten
 Hans Christian Blech as Naso, Clown mit Puppe
 Roma Bahn as Eine Zirkusbesucherin
 Evelyn Cormand as Germaine LaRue, Königin der Luft
 Al Hoosmann as Bonga, der Löwenwärter
 Wolfgang Müller
 Wolfgang Neuss
 Charles Regnier
 Hans Stiebner as Brazzini, Polizeiinspektor
 Howard Vernon as Armand LaRue, König der Luft
 Helmut von Hofe as Kapitän Nemo, der Todesfahrer
 Fritz Wagner
 Ralf Wolter as Motta, Geschäftsführer

References

Bibliography
 Bock, Hans-Michael & Bergfelder, Tim. The Concise CineGraph. Encyclopedia of German Cinema. Berghahn Books, 2009.

External links 
 

1954 films
1950s thriller films
German thriller films
West German films
1950s German-language films
Films directed by Paul May
Circus films
Horror films about clowns
1954 horror films
Films shot at Spandau Studios
German black-and-white films
1950s German films